Jabłonka  is a village in the administrative district of Gmina Dźwierzuty, within Szczytno County, Warmian-Masurian Voivodeship, in northern Poland.

Notable residents 
 Christoph Hartknoch (1644–1687), historian and educator

References 

Villages in Szczytno County